The Asian Youth Orchestra (AYO) is a youth orchestra composed of musicians from several Asian countries. It was founded by Yehudi Menuhin and Richard Pontzious in 1987, and its first concert took place in August 1990, conducted by Menuhin. Currently, the orchestra's artistic director is Richard Pontzious, its principal conductor is James Judd, and its conductor laureate is Sergiu Comissiona.

History
AYO's history includes the premiere of Tan Dun's Symphony 1997 with cellist Yo-Yo Ma, and concerts in venues such as Beijing's Great Hall of the People, New York's Avery Fisher Hall, California's Hollywood Bowl, Amsterdam's Concertgebouw, Berlin's Shauspielhaus, Vienna's Konzerthaus, Northern Virginia's Wolf Trap, and the Sydney Opera House. The orchestra has also performed in the White House and at the United Nations.

A formation committee of Hong Kong businessmen and women created the organizational structure for the Asian Youth Orchestra in 1987 and established it as a tax-exempt non-profit organization qualified under Section 88 of the Hong Kong Inland Revenue Ordinance.

In 2017, the orchestra made its debut at Young Euro Classic.

Membership
The members of the Asian Youth Orchestra (AYO) are pre-professional musicians from China, Taiwan, Hong Kong, Indonesia, Japan, Korea, Malaysia, the Philippines, Singapore, Thailand and Vietnam. Chosen through auditions held throughout the region, the orchestra members spend six weeks together each summer: first, they participate in a three-week rehearsal camp in Hong Kong, and then they travel for another three weeks on a tour with conductors and soloists.

Notable soloists
Cellists Yo-Yo Ma, Mischa Maisky, Jian Wang and Alisa Weilerstein, violinists Sarah Chang, Vadim Repin, Gidon Kremer, Gil Shaham, Elmar Oliveira, Young Uck Kim, Yu-Chien Tseng, Suwanai Akiko and Cho-Liang Lin, soprano Elly Ameling, pianists Alicia de Larrocha, Cecile Licad, Leon Fleisher, Anna Tsybuleva, the Beaux Arts Trio and trumpeter Hakan Hardenberger are among those who have performed with AYO. Conductors include Sergiu Comissiona, Alexander Schneider, Tan Dun, Okko Kamu, Eri Klas, principal conductor James Judd, and the orchestra's co-founders, Yehudi Menuhin and Richard Pontzious.

Recordings
https://web.archive.org/web/20110707175553/http://www.asianyouthorchestra.com/index-hear.html

See also 
 List of youth orchestras

References

External links
 Official Website
 https://web.archive.org/web/20121006085028/http://www.asianyouthorchestra.com/report-2006.html
 Young Asian Musicians to Tour Europe in The New York Times

Asian orchestras
Youth orchestras
Musical groups established in 1990
Winners of the Nikkei Asia Prize